Miran Hrovatin (11 September 1949 – 20 March 1994) was an Italian photographer and camera operator killed in Mogadishu, Somalia, together with journalist Ilaria Alpi under mysterious circumstances.

Background and death
Hrovatin belonged to the Slovenian ethnic community of Trieste. He worked before for the agency Alpe Adria then for the agency Videoest of Trieste.

On 20 March 1994, he and Ilaria Alpi were killed in an ambush on their jeep in Mogadishu by a seven-man commando unit after returning from Bosaso, while they were in Mogadishu reporting for Rai 3. With them were a bodyguard, who escaped unharmed and disappeared, and the driver Sid Abdi who was also unhurt.

Miran was in Somalia to cover the Somali Civil War and investigate on an illegal traffic of weapons and toxic waste possibly concerning also the Italian Army and other Italian institutions.

In 2000, Somali citizen Hashi Omar Hassan was convicted and sentenced to 26 years in prison for the double murder. In October 2016, a court in Perugia, Italy, reversed the conviction and Hassan was awarded more than three million euros for the wrongful conviction and nearly 17 years he had spent in prison.

Aftermath
In May 2009, Daniel Biacchessi wrote the story of Miran in his book Passion reporter.

On 20 March 2014, 20 years after their death, the Italian government has reportedly authorized the declassification of secret files into their death.

The Ilaria Alpi Award for Television Journalism was created in his honor.

See also
List of unsolved murders

References

External links
The complete list of Italian information war dead (after the end of World War II) on the website www.ilariaalpi.it. 
Fondazione Luchetta Ota D'Angelo Hrovatin

1949 births
1990s murders in Somalia
1994 crimes in Somalia
1994 deaths
1994 murders in Africa
20th-century Italian journalists
Assassinated Italian journalists
Italian male journalists
Italian people murdered abroad
Italian people of Slovene descent
Journalists killed while covering the Somali Civil War
Unsolved murders in Somalia
20th-century Italian male writers